Turbonilla exilis is a species of sea snail, a marine gastropod mollusk in the family Pyramidellidae, the pyrams and their allies.

Description
The shell grows to a length of 4.2 mm.

Distribution
This marine species occurs in the following locations at depths between 5 m to 115 m:
 Atlantic Ocean: North Carolina
 Caribbean Sea: Florida; Jamaica, Haiti
 Lesser Antilles: Virgin Islands: St. Croix

References

External links
 To Biodiversity Heritage Library (3 publications)
 To Encyclopedia of Life
 To ITIS
 To World Register of Marine Species

exilis
Gastropods described in 1850